Sir Alan Towers Traill  (5 July 193517 April 2020) was a British politician who served as Lord Mayor of London from 1984 to 1985.

In the 1990 New Zealand Queen's Birthday Honours, Traill was appointed a Companion of the Queen's Service Order for public services.

Traill died on 17 April 2020 at the age of 84. He was survived by his wife, Sarah, and son, Phillip.

References

1936 births
2020 deaths
20th-century lord mayors of London
Knights Grand Cross of the Order of the British Empire
Companions of the Queen's Service Order